Hypocrita aletta is a moth of the family Erebidae. It was described by Caspar Stoll in 1782. It is found in Suriname, Costa Rica and Panama.

References

Hypocrita
Moths described in 1782